Missanabie station is a Via Rail flag stop station located in the community of Missanabie, Ontario on the Sudbury – White River train. The station has existed since the late 19th century, when it provided an important connection between the Hudson's Bay Company trading post system and the Canadian Pacific Railway.

References

External links
Via Rail page for Missanabie train station

Via Rail stations in Ontario
Railway stations in Algoma District
Canadian Pacific Railway stations in Ontario